Design for Scandal is a 1941 American romantic comedy film directed by Norman Taurog. Rosalind Russell stars as a judge targeted by a newspaper tycoon unhappy with her decision in his divorce case.

Plot
When wealthy newspaper publisher Judson M. Blair divorces his wife Adele, judge Cornelia C. Porter awards Adele alimony of $4,000 per month for five years or until she remarries. After learning from his lawyer Northcott that Porter refuses to hear an appeal, Blair is furious and unsuccessfully tries to wield his influence with Porter's boss Judge Graham to have Porter transferred.

Reporter Jeff Sherman, recently fired by Blair, offers a solution in exchange for a promotion, a raise, a bonus and an unlimited expense account. Blair accedes to all of his demands. Sherman convinces his manicurist girlfriend Dotty to pretend to agree to marry him in the near future. He then tries to romance Porter, intending to threaten her with an alienation-of-affections scandal to force her to reduce Blair's alimony burden.

When Porter takes a two-month vacation, Sherman follows her. Having researched Porter's interests, Sherman pretends to be a sculptor. To obtain an artist's studio in the fully booked resort town, Sherman persuades sculptor Alexander Raoul that Blair has offered him a commission to decorate his building. Sherman then begins to woo Porter. She considers him a nuisance, but he is eventually able to win her love. To his dismay, he finds that he has fallen for her as well.

Porter learns about the scheme before Sherman can confess, and has both Blair and Sherman arrested. At their trial, Sherman acts as his own lawyer and calls Porter to the witness stand, where he asks her to marry him. Under oath, she is forced to admit that she did love him at one point, and she runs out in tears. When Sherman chases after her, he is knocked down. Believing that he has been hurt, Porter rushes back to him, and they are reconciled. Blair becomes irate when he discovers that after he had convinced his ex-wife to agree to a lump-sum settlement, she promptly married another wealthy magnate.

Cast

Box office
According to MGM records, the film earned $659,000 in the U.S. and Canada and $398,000 elsewhere, resulting in a profit of $139,000.

References

External links 

 
 
 
 

1941 films
1941 comedy-drama films
1941 romantic comedy films
1941 romantic drama films
1940s romantic comedy-drama films
American black-and-white films
American romantic comedy-drama films
1940s English-language films
Films directed by Norman Taurog
Films scored by Franz Waxman
Metro-Goldwyn-Mayer films
1940s American films